BankVic is an Australian member-owned mutual bank. It was founded as the Police Association Credit Co Operative, commonly known as Police Credit or Police Credit Co-Op, by police officers in 1974 as a credit union. On 1 June 2013, Police Credit became BankVic (Police Financial Services Limited). It now serves police and other emergency services employees, people in the health industry and other public servants, as well as their families and friends.

In 2011, Police Credit reported that the organisation had 91,000 members, employed 120 staff and had $1 billion (Australian) in assets under management. In 2014, BankVic celebrated its 40th anniversary and is one of Victoria's largest Mutual Banks with assets in excess of $1.3B and over 97,000  members.

The bank is wholly owned by its members, who are all equal shareholders. As a co-operative, it is not focused on profits or paying dividends to shareholders.  All profits from the bank's products and services are reinvested into the organisation for members to directly benefit. Their key responsibility is to help members achieve a more secure financial future.

BankVic was awarded the 2014 Canstar Customer Owned Banking Institution of the Year, making it back to back winners after winning Money Magazine Credit Union of the year in 2013. The bank supports a wide variety of police, health and community organisations such as the Blue Ribbon Foundation and Limbs 4 Life.

References

External links 

 BankVic website

Banks of Australia
Mutual savings banks in Australia